PayNow is a near-instant real-time payment system developed by Association of Banks in Singapore. The interface facilitates inter-bank peer-to-peer and person-to-merchant transactions.  The system is supported by all major Singaporean banks and is regulated by the Monetary Authority of Singapore (MAS) and works by transferring funds between two bank accounts.

Payments can be made to any registered Singaporean mobile number, NRIC, corporate Unique Entity Number (UEN) or Virtual Payment Address (VPA).  Scanning QR codes is also an option.  PayNow is linked with other payment providers including Stripe, DuitNow (Malaysia), PromptPay (Thailand) and UPI (India).

In 2020, 125 million transactions worth S$22 billion were processed through PayNow.

References 

2017 establishments in Singapore
Payment interchange standards
Interbank networks
Banking in Singapore
Mobile payments
Mobile payments in Singapore